Joseph Maria Kelly (born 20 December 1972) is a musician, songwriter, and athlete of Irish-American descent.

Kelly became known as a member of the Kelly Family, however, during the band's hiatus, he appeared primarily as an amateur athlete and participated in various sport competitions. Kelly returned to the Kelly Family as a drummer and vocalist in 2017. As a member of the Kelly family, he plays electric and acoustic guitar and percussion instruments.

Sports enthusiast Kelly often participates in endurance competitions and fun events, such as TV total, Wok racing or diving. Kelly has admitted he looks like "an entirely unrelated Joey Kelly" during these appearances.

Sports

Endurance 
As of 2006, Kelly has finished over 50 marathons and has participated in endurance competitions – including events such as Ultramarathon, Ironman Triathlon or Tough-Guy-Race.
He is the only person to have finished in each of the available eight Ironman competitions in the years 1998 and 1999. As more of these are conducted today, this is no longer possible.
He took part at the Ultraman competition in Hawaii, 1998 (10 km swimming, 421 km cycling, 84 km running in three days) and finished seventh, he reached the goal within the time limit, but was subsequently disqualified for unsportsmanlike conduct, after kicking a prone volunteer in the head following an "earlier altercation".
In the Race Across America (RAAM) 2001, a long-distance bicycle race across the United States, he finished together with Thorsten Vahl as fourth of seven competing teams and in 2002 he finished in the winning 4 person mixed team, which included his wife.
In 2008 he participated in the Atacama Crossing in Chile and finished the 250 kilometres in 6 days, 36:15:3 hours. He finished the six legs in fourth place, becoming first in his age group in one of the toughest desert races in the world.

Television events 
Wok-WM
 2003: Silver (Single)
 2004: Silver (Single), Gold (Quad)
 2005: Bronze (Single), Gold (Quad)
 2006: Gold (Single)
 2007: Silver (Single)
 2008: Bronze (Single)
 2009: Bronze (Single)
 2010: Silver (Single)
 2014: Gold (Single)
Turmspringen (diving)
 2007: Gold (Single)
 2008: Silver (Single), Bronze (Synchronous)
 2009: Bronze (Singles), Gold (Synchronous)
Stockcar Crash Challenge
 2006: Rodeo winner
Auto Ball-EM
 2008: Runner-up
German Cup Eisfußball
 2009: Winner
Poker Night
 2009: Winner

Personal life 
Kelly married former musician Tanja Niethen in 2005. The couple has two sons (* 2000 and * 2004) and a daughter (* 2006).

Social commitment 

At a fundraising race, as part of the RTL Fundraising Marathon, Kelly completed the route Berlin–Baġdād in 11 days on a bicycle, taking turns with extreme sports athlete Hubert Schwarz. The €40,000 raised went partly into the RTL Fundraising Marathon and partly to the private aid organization CARE to be donated to a children's hospital.
On 23 November 2006, Kelly took part in another edition of the marathon, setting a new world record on a novelty twin cycle, covering 135.3 kilometres of distance and 43,077 metres of elevation within 24 hours, rotating around their own axis 9.088 times in the process. The €50,000 raised have been donated.

Kelly is an officially appointed ambassador for the  e.V.

References

External links 
 Official website (in German)
 Result List of Ultraman 1998

1972 births
Living people
Spanish musicians
People from Toledo, Spain